Erysiphe flexuosa is a plant pathogen that causes powdery mildew on horse chestnut. It is native to North America but is currently spreading epidemically through Europe.

References

Fungi of North America
Fungal tree pathogens and diseases
flexuosa
Fungi described in 2000